The Billboard Top Christian Albums ranks the best-performing Christian music albums of the week in the United States. The chart was titled Top Contemporary Christian Albums until 2003 and was renamed to the Top Christian Albums on issue date August 16, 2003.
The data is compiled by Nielsen SoundScan based collectively on each album's weekly physical (CD, vinyl and cassette) sales. Throughout the decade, a total of 129 albums claimed the top spot of the chart.

WOW albums were the most successful of the decade. Twelve albums spent a total of 75 weeks atop, with two albums topping the year end charts.

Number-ones

Statistics
The following artists have spent at least ten weeks atop the chart, with at least three albums:

The following albums have spent at least ten weeks atop the chart throughout the decade:

See also
 List of number-one Billboard Christian Songs of the 2000s

References
Notes

Footnotes

Christian Albums 2000s
United States Christian
Contemporary Christian Albums